Jacob Lambrechtsz. Loncke (1580–1644) was a Dutch Golden Age painter from Zierikzee.

He was the son of Lambrecht Jeroen Pietersz Loncke and Mayke Cornelis Leijst and the brother of Rochus. He married  Sara Rembrandtsdr Verboom, and married a second time to Marijken Waarsegger op 4 November 1625 in Zierikzee. Little is known of his life. He is known for portraits and in 1618 was deacon of the artists' guild in Zierikzee.

References

1580 births
1644 deaths
Dutch Golden Age painters
Dutch male painters
People from Zierikzee
Painters by city
16th-century Dutch people
17th-century Dutch people